Hoplodictya is a genus of marsh flies in the family Sciomyzidae. There are about five described species in Hoplodictya.

Species
H. acuticornis (Wulp, 1897)
H. australis Fisher and Orth, 1972
H. kincaidi (Johnson, 1913)
H. setosa (Coquillett, 1901)
H. spinicornis (Loew, 1866)

References

Further reading

External links

 

Sciomyzidae
Sciomyzoidea genera